Espinal is a Spanish surname. Notable people with the surname include:

Jaime Espinal (born 1984), Puerto Rican sport wrestler
José Espinal (born 1982), Dominican footballer
Luís Espinal Camps (1932–1980), Spanish missionary to Bolivia
Marcos Espinal, Dominican physician
Panya Clark Espinal (born 1965), Canadian sculptor
Rafael Espinal, American politician
Ramón Tapia Espinal (1926–2002), Dominican lawyer and politician
Raynel Espinal (born 1991) Dominican professional baseball player
Santiago Espinal (born 1994), Dominican professional baseball player
Vinicio Espinal (born 1982), Dominican footballer

Spanish-language surnames